Meadow River Wildlife Management Area, is located near Rupert, West Virginia in Greenbrier County.   Occupying   of river bottomland, the WMA is located along the Meadow River and consists mainly of wetlands habitat.

Hunting and fishing

Hunting opportunities include deer, grouse, raccoon, squirrel, turkey, waterfowl, and woodcock.

Fishing is available in the Meadow River.

Camping is not available in the WMA.  Camping is available in nearby Babcock State Park.

See also
Animal conservation
Fishing
Hunting
List of West Virginia wildlife management areas

References

External links
West Virginia DNR District 4 Wildlife Management Areas
West Virginia Hunting Regulations
West Virginia Fishing Regulations

Wildlife management areas of West Virginia
Protected areas of Greenbrier County, West Virginia
IUCN Category V